Monestier is a commune in the Allier department in central France.

Geography
The river Bouble forms most of the commune's southwestern border, then flows east through its southern part.

Population

See also
Communes of the Allier department

References

Communes of Allier
Allier communes articles needing translation from French Wikipedia